West Lincoln Township is located in Logan County, Illinois. As of the 2010 census, its population was 7,685 and it contained 3,558 housing units.

Geography

Cities, Towns, Villages

Lincoln (west half)

Unincorporated Towns

Bell
Burtonview (east half)

Extinct Towns

Postville at

Demographics

References

External links
US Census
City-data.com
Illinois State Archives

Townships in Logan County, Illinois
Townships in Illinois